A straw man fallacy (sometimes written as strawman) is a form of argument and an informal fallacy of having the impression of refuting an argument, whereas the real subject of the argument was not addressed or refuted, but instead replaced with a false one. One who engages in this fallacy is said to be "attacking a straw man".

The typical straw man argument creates the illusion of having  refuted or defeated an opponent's proposition through the covert replacement of it with a different proposition (i.e., "stand up a straw man") and the subsequent refutation of that false argument ("knock down a straw man") instead of the opponent's proposition. Straw man arguments have been used throughout history in polemical debate, particularly regarding highly charged emotional subjects.

Straw man tactics in the United Kingdom may also be known as an Aunt Sally, after a pub game of the same name, where patrons throw sticks or battens at a post to knock off a skittle balanced on top.

Structure
The straw man fallacy occurs in the following pattern of argument:

 Person 1 asserts proposition X.
 Person 2 argues against a superficially similar proposition Y, falsely, as if an argument against Y were an argument against X.

This reasoning is a fallacy of relevance: it fails to address the proposition in question by misrepresenting the opposing position.

For example:
 Quoting an opponent's words out of context—i.e., choosing quotations that misrepresent the opponent's intentions (see fallacy of quoting out of context).
 Presenting someone who defends a position poorly as the defender, then denying that person's arguments—thus giving the appearance that every upholder of that position (and thus the position itself) has been defeated.
 Oversimplifying an opponent's argument, then attacking this oversimplified version.
 Exaggerating (sometimes grossly) an opponent's argument, then attacking this exaggerated version.

Contemporary revisions
In 2006, Robert Talisse and Scott Aikin expanded the application and use of the straw man fallacy beyond that of previous rhetorical scholars, arguing that the straw man fallacy can take two forms: the original form that misrepresents the opponent's position, which they call the representative form; and a new form they call the selection form.

The selection form focuses on a partial and weaker (and easier to refute) representation of the opponent's position. Then the easier refutation of this weaker position is claimed to refute the opponent's complete position. They point out the similarity of the selection form to the fallacy of hasty generalization, in which the refutation of an opposing position that is weaker than the opponent's is claimed as a refutation of all opposing arguments. Because they have found significantly increased use of the selection form in modern political argumentation, they view its identification as an important new tool for the improvement of public discourse.

Aikin and Casey expanded on this model in 2010, introducing a third form. Referring to the "representative form" as the classic straw man, and the "selection form" as the weak man, the third form is called the hollow man. A hollow man argument is one that is a complete fabrication, where both the viewpoint and the opponent expressing it do not in fact exist, or at the very least the arguer has never encountered them. Such arguments frequently take the form of vague phrasing such as "some say," "someone out there thinks" or similar weasel words, or it might attribute a non-existent argument to a broad movement in general, rather than an individual or organization.

A variation on the selection form, or "weak man" argument, that combines with an ad hominem and fallacy of composition is nut picking, a neologism coined by Kevin Drum. A combination of "nut" (i.e., insane person) and "cherry picking", as well as a play on the word "nitpicking," nut picking refers to intentionally seeking out extremely fringe, non-representative statements from or members of an opposing group and parading these as evidence of that entire group's incompetence or irrationality.

Examples 
An everyday conversation:
Alice: Taking a shower is beneficial.
Bob: But hot water may damage your skin.
Bob attacked the non-existing argument: . Because such an argument is obviously false, Alice might start believing that she is wrong because what Bob said was clearly true. Her real argument, however, was not disproved, because she did not say anything about the temperature.
Alice: I didn't mean taking an extremely hot shower.
Alice noticed the trick and defended herself.

Straw man arguments often arise in public debates such as a (hypothetical) prohibition debate:

A: We should relax the laws on beer.
B: No, any society with unrestricted access to intoxicants loses its work ethic and goes only for immediate gratification.

The original proposal was to relax laws on beer. Person B has misconstrued/misrepresented this proposal by responding to it as if it had been "unrestricted access to intoxicants". It is a logical fallacy because Person A never advocated allowing said unrestricted access to intoxicants (this is also a slippery slope argument).

In a 1977 appeal of a U.S. bank robbery conviction, a prosecuting attorney said in his oral argument:

This was a straw man designed to alarm the appellate judges; the chance that the precedent set by one case would literally make it impossible to convict any bank robbers is remote.

An example often given of a straw man is US President Richard Nixon's 1952 "Checkers speech". When campaigning for vice president in 1952, Nixon was accused of having illegally appropriated $18,000 in campaign funds for his personal use. In a televised response, based on an earlier Franklin D. Roosevelt's Fala speech, he spoke about another gift, a dog he had been given by a supporter:

This was a straw man response; his critics had never criticized the dog as a gift or suggested he return it. This argument was successful at distracting many people from the funds and portraying his critics as nitpicking and heartless.  Nixon received an outpouring of public support and remained on the ticket. He and Eisenhower were later elected.

Christopher Tindale presents, as an example, the following passage from a draft of a bill (HCR 74) considered by the Louisiana State Legislature in 2001:

Tindale comments that "the portrait painted of Darwinian ideology is a caricature, one not borne out by any objective survey of the works cited." The fact that similar misrepresentations of Darwinian thinking have been used to justify and approve racist practices is besides the point: the position that the legislation is attacking and dismissing is a straw man. In subsequent debate, this error was recognized, and the eventual bill omitted all mention of Darwin and Darwinist ideology. Darwin passionately opposed slavery and worked to intellectually confront the notions of "scientific racism" that were used to justify it.

History
Perhaps the earliest known use of the phrase was by Martin Luther in his book On the Babylonian Captivity of the Church (1520), where he is responding to arguments of the Roman Catholic Church and clergy attempting to delegitimize his criticisms, specifically on the correct way to serve the Eucharist. The church claimed Martin Luther is arguing against serving the Eucharist according to one type of serving practice; Martin Luther states he never asserted that in his criticisms towards them and in fact they themselves are making this argument. Their persistence in making this false argument causes him to coin the phrase in this statement: "they assert the very things they assail, or they set up a man of straw whom they may attack." 

Rev. William Harrison. A Description of England 1577 complained that when men had lived in houses of willow they were men of oak, and that now they lived in houses of oak they were men of willow and "a great manie altogither of straw".

Etymology
As a fallacy, the identification and name of straw man arguments are of relatively recent date, although Aristotle makes remarks that suggest a similar concern; Douglas N. Walton identified "the first inclusion of it we can find in a textbook as an informal fallacy" in Stuart Chase's Guides to Straight Thinking from 1956 (p. 40). By contrast, Hamblin's classic text Fallacies (1970) neither mentions it as a distinct type, nor even as a historical term.

The term's origins are a matter of debate, though the usage of the term in rhetoric suggests a human figure made of straw that is easy to knock down or destroy—such as a military training dummy, scarecrow, or effigy. A common but false etymology is that it refers to men who stood outside courthouses with a straw in their shoe to signal their willingness to be a false witness. The Online Etymology Dictionary states that the term “man of straw” can be traced back to 1620 as “an easily refuted imaginary opponent in an argument.”

Steelmanning

A steel man argument (or steelmanning) is the opposite of a straw man argument. Steelmanning is the practice of addressing the strongest form of "the other person's argument [(the steel man argument)], even if it's not the one they presented". Creating the strongest form of the opponent's argument may involve removing flawed assumptions that could be easily refuted or developing the strongest points which counter one's own position, as "we know our belief's real weak points". Developing counters to these strongest arguments an opponent might bring results in producing an even stronger argument for one's own position. It has been advocated as a more productive strategy in political dialog that promotes real understanding and compromise instead of fueling partisanship by discussing only the weakest arguments of the opposition. Others, however, have argued against steelmanning because it still changes the argument given and can result in strawmanning. As a result, the steelman argument might be met with "Hey, I didn't mean that". Others have pointed toward the frequency with which people misinterpret the beliefs of others and how said misinterpretations are condescending. Karnofsky noted that he dislikes engaging with steelman arguments as they "rarely resemble his actual views".

See also

References

External links
 Straw Man Arguments: How to Recognize, How to Counter, and When to Use Them Yourself: a discussion of straw man arguments and their usage in debates.
 The Straw Man Fallacy at the Fallacy Files
 Straw Man, more examples of straw man arguments

16th-century neologisms
Martin Luther
Relevance fallacies
Barriers to critical thinking
Error
Political metaphors referring to people